Coffee Springs is a town in Geneva County, Alabama, United States. It was incorporated in 1900, and it is considered to be a part of the Dothan, Alabama Metropolitan Statistical Area. At the 2010 census the population was 228, down from 251.

Geography
Coffee Springs is located at  (31.166736, -85.910634).

Demographics

As of the census of 2000, there were 251 people, 108 households, and 74 families residing in the town. The racial makeup of the town was 93.23% White, 3.98% Black or African American, and 2.79% from two or more races.

There were 108 households, out of which 17.6% had children under the age of 18 living with them, 57.4% were married couples living together, 12.0% had a female householder with no husband present, and 30.6% were non-families. 24.1% of all households were made up of individuals, and 15.7% had someone living alone who was 65 years of age or older. The average household size was 2.32 and the average family size was 2.77.

In the town, the population was spread out, with 16.7% under the age of 18, 8.0% from 18 to 24, 18.3% from 25 to 44, 36.3% from 45 to 64, and 20.7% who were 65 years of age or older. The median age was 50 years. For every 100 females, there were 78.0 males. For every 100 females age 18 and over, there were 77.1 males.

The median income for a household in the town was $26,477, and the median income for a family was $30,000. Males had a median income of $28,750 versus $15,833 for females. The per capita income for the town was $12,393. About 13.8% of families and 17.1% of the population were below the poverty line, including 15.4% of those under the age of eighteen and 25.3% of those 65 or over.

Climate
The climate in this area is characterized by hot, humid summers and generally mild to cool winters.  According to the Köppen Climate Classification system, Coffee Springs has a humid subtropical climate, abbreviated "Cfa" on climate maps.

Notable person
 Jim Bowdoin, professional American football player who played guard for seven seasons for the Green Bay Packers, Brooklyn Dodgers, New York Giants, and Portsmouth Spartans

References 

Towns in Alabama
Towns in Geneva County, Alabama
Dothan metropolitan area, Alabama